"Without You" is a 2014 song by the American record producer Junior Sanchez featuring vocals by CeCe Peniston. Released on January 6, 2014, the single was issued in Europe via local Size Records, based in Sweden.

Credits and personnel

 Eugenio Sánchez  - performer, producer
 Cecilia Peniston - vocals

Track listing and format
 MD, EU, #SIZE085
 "Without You - 5:24

References

General

2014 singles
CeCe Peniston songs
2014 songs